Huntington Estate is an Australian winery based in Mudgee, New South Wales owned and operated by Tim and Nicky Stevens.

History
The winery was established in 1969 by Sydney solicitor Bob Roberts and his wife Wendy. Bob purchased 140 acres of land from fruit grower Kath Leggatt and farmer Marcel Ribeaux. He planted 20 acres of vines. The winery was built in 1972 and was designed and built by Bob Roberts, and constructed from concrete blocks.

By 1980 Huntington Estate comprised 100 acres of vines including shiraz, cabernet sauvignon, pinot noir, merlot, semillon and chardonnay. In 1998 Bob Roberts was awarded the Graham Gregory award acknowledging an individual's outstanding contribution to the NSW wine industry.

In 2005, upon the retirement of Bob and Wendy Roberts, Tim Stevens purchased the Huntington Estate business. Tim Stevens had been a journalist prior to purchasing the neighbouring Abercorn vineyard in 1996.

Huntington Estate is also known for the Huntington Estate Music Festival, held each year in the winery's barrel hall. The week long concerts are directed by Artistic Director Carl Vine, and comprise a collection of prominent international artists alongside Australian musicians. The Festival has been described as "a world-class annual festival of chamber music."

Winemaker
Huntington Estate wines are made by owner Tim Stevens. Prior to purchasing Huntington Estate Wines, Tim was the owner and winemaker at Abercorn Wines, a neighbouring vineyard to Huntington Estate.

Awards
Huntington Estate is a highly acclaimed winery, having won more than 130 trophies including NSW Wine of the Year in 1998; Most Successful Exhibitor at the Mudgee Wine Show on multiple occasions; and more than 350 gold medals.

At the 2018 Mudgee Wine Show, the 2015 Huntington Estate Late Harvest Semillon was awarded the Trophy for the Most Outstanding Sweet Wine of the Show (for class 16 & 17)

See also
 Australian wine
 Mudgee wine region

References

External links

Wineries in New South Wales
Australian winemakers
Mudgee, New South Wales
Australian companies established in 1969
Food and drink companies established in 1969